ESL Federal Credit Union is a full-service financial institution with headquarters in Rochester, New York. The locally owned financial institution employs more than 870 people in Rochester, New York and, includes more than 376,000 members and 11,800 businesses.  The company has now appeared on the Great Place to Work Best Small and Medium Workplaces for 10 years (2020, 2019, 2018, 2017, 2016, 2015, 2014, 2013, 2011 and 2010). Access to the credit union includes 22 branch locations and more than 40 ATM locations, locally based telephone and internet chat centers, and online and mobile banking channels. Membership in ESL is open to employees of Eastman Kodak, members of the George Eastman House, and residents of Rochester, among others.

History
ESL Federal Credit Union was chartered in 1920 as Eastman Savings and Loan Association by George Eastman, founder of Eastman Kodak Company. Eastman’s intent was to provide his employees with a financial institution that served their financial needs by providing savings accounts and mortgages.

On February 1, 1996, Eastman Savings and Loan changed its charter from a U.S. bank to a Federal Credit Union, changing its name to ESL Federal Credit Union. It is the largest locally owned financial institution in the Greater Rochester area and the largest credit union in New York State. ESL is in the top 1% of national credit unions ranked by assets.

References

External links
 

1920 establishments in New York (state)
Banks established in 1920
Companies based in Rochester, New York
Credit unions based in New York (state)
Privately held companies of the United States